Cyan is the color between green and blue on the visible spectrum of light. It is evoked by light with a predominant wavelength between 490 and 520 nm, between the wavelengths of green and blue.

In the subtractive color system, or CMYK color model, which can be overlaid to produce all colors in paint and color printing, cyan is one of the primary colors, along with magenta and yellow. In the additive color system, or RGB color model, used to create all the colors on a computer or television display, cyan is made by mixing equal amounts of green and blue light. Cyan is the complement of red; it can be made by the removal of red from white. Mixing red light and cyan light at the right intensity will make white light.

Colors in the cyan color range are teal, turquoise, electric blue, aquamarine, and others described as blue-green.

Etymology and terminology
Its name is derived from the Ancient Greek word kyanos (κύανος), meaning "dark blue enamel, Lapis lazuli". It was formerly known as "cyan blue" or cyan-blue, and its first recorded use as a color name in English was in 1879. Further origins of the color name can be traced back to a dye produced from the cornflower (Centaurea cyanus).

In most languages, 'cyan' is not a basic color term and it phenomenologically appears as a greenish vibrant hue of blue to most English speakers. In Punjabi language "Siana" (ਸਿਆਣਾ) word means matured and wise after learning and Other English terms for this "borderline" hue region include blue green, aqua, turquoise, teal, and grue.

Cyan on the web and in printing

The web colors cyan and aqua

The web color cyan shown at right is a secondary color in the RGB color model, which uses combinations of red, green and blue light to create all the colors on computer and television displays. In X11 colors, this color is called both cyan and aqua. In the HTML color list, this same color is called aqua.

The web colors are more vivid than the cyan used in the CMYK color system, and the web colors cannot be accurately reproduced on a printed page. To reproduce the web color cyan in inks, it is necessary to add some white ink to the printer's cyan below, so when it is reproduced in printing, it is not a primary subtractive color. It is called aqua (a name in use since 1598) because it is a color commonly associated with water, such as the appearance of the water at a tropical beach.

Process cyan

Cyan is also one of the common inks used in four-color printing, along with magenta, yellow, and black; this set of colors is referred to as CMYK. In printing, the cyan ink is sometimes known as printer's cyan, process cyan, or process blue.

While both the additive secondary and the subtractive primary are called cyan, they can be substantially different from one another. Cyan printing ink is typically more saturated than the RGB secondary cyan, depending on what RGB color space and ink are considered. That is, process cyan is usually outside the RGB gamut, and there is no fixed conversion from CMYK primaries to RGB. Different formulations are used for printer's ink, so there can be variations in the printed color that is pure cyan ink. This is because real-world subtractive (unlike additive) color mixing does not consistently produce the same result when mixing apparently identical colors, since the specific frequencies filtered out to produce that color affect how it interacts with other colors. Phthalocyanine blue is one such commonly used pigment. A typical formulation of process cyan is shown in the color box at right.

In science and nature

Color of water
 Pure water is nearly colorless. However, it does absorb slightly more red light than blue, giving significant volumes of water a bluish tint; increased scattering of blue light due to fine particles in the water shifts the blue color toward green, for a typically cyan net color.

Cyan and cyanide
 Cyanide derives its name from Prussian blue, a blue pigment containing the cyanide ion.

Bacteria
 Cyanobacteria (sometimes called blue-green algae) are an important link in the food chain.

Astronomy
 The planet Uranus is colored cyan because of the abundance of methane in its atmosphere. Methane absorbs red light and reflects the blue-green light which allows observers to see it as cyan.

Energy
 Natural gas (methane), used by many for home cooking on gas stoves, has a cyan colored flame when burned with a mixture of air.

Photography and film
 Cyanotype, or blueprint, a monochrome photographic printing process that predates the use of the word cyan as a color, yields a deep cyan-blue colored print based on the Prussian blue pigment.
 Cinecolor, a bi-pack color process, the photographer would load a standard camera with two films, one orthochromatic, dyed red, and a panchromatic strip behind it. Color light would expose the cyan record on the ortho stock, which also acted as a filter, exposing only red light to the panchromatic film stock.

Medicine
 Cyanosis is an abnormal blueness of the skin, usually a sign of poor oxygen intake; patients are typically described as being "cyanotic".
 Cyanopsia is a color vision defect where vision is tinted blue. This can be a drug-induced side effect or experienced after cataract removal.

Gallery

See also

 Blue–green distinction in language
 Shades of cyan 
 Lists of colors

References

Primary colors
Secondary colors
Optical spectrum
Shades of blue
Shades of green
Rainbow colors
Shades of cyan
Tertiary colors